James Lynch House is a historic home located at Nutten Hook in Columbia County, New York.  It was built about 1900 and is a two-story, light frame building on a brick foundation.  It functioned as the Nutten Hook post office from about 1948 to 1955.  It was built for James Lynch, who operated the adjacent Lynch Hotel.

It was added to the National Register of Historic Places in 2009.

References

Houses on the National Register of Historic Places in New York (state)
Houses completed in 1900
Houses in Columbia County, New York
National Register of Historic Places in Columbia County, New York